The Kyffhäuserkreis is a district in the northern part of Thuringia, Germany. Neighboring districts are the districts Mansfeld-Südharz, Saalekreis und Burgenlandkreis in Saxony-Anhalt, and the districts Sömmerda, Unstrut-Hainich-Kreis and Eichsfeld.

History
In the 12th century there was a castle, the Kyffhausen Castle,  on the Kyffhäuser mountains, which was built during the reign of emperor Frederick I. According to the local legend, the emperor did not die, but instead went to sleep in this castle.

From 1579 on the region belonged to Saxony, and after 1815 it was divided between the Prussian Province of Saxony and Schwarzburg-Sondershausen.

In 1952 the two districts of Artern (district) and Sondershausen were established. These districts were merged in 1994, with only a few municipalities joining other districts.

Historical Population 
Values as of 31 December:

 Data source since 1994: Thuringian State Statistical Bureau

Partnerships
The district has a partnership with the district Ahrweiler in Rhineland-Palatinate, which was initially established with the district Artern in 1990.

Geography
The district is named after the Kyffhäuser mountains. The main river is the Unstrut, which flows through the east of the district.

Coat of arms
The main symbol of the coat of arms is the lion of the counts of Schwarzburg, who historically ruled most of the district. The lion holds a shield which contains the coat of arms of the Counts of Mansfeld, who owned the area around Artern in the 18th century. The three green hills in the bottom symbolize the mountainous landscape with many forests, the big wavy line stands for the river Unstrut, the small one for the Wipper river.

Towns and municipalities

{|
|-----
!Verwaltungsgemeinschaft-free towns
!colspan=2|and municipalities
|-
|valign=top|
An der Schmücke
Artern
Bad Frankenhausen
Ebeleben
Greußen
Roßleben-Wiehe
Sondershausen
|valign=top|
Abtsbessingen
Bellstedt
Borxleben
Etzleben
Freienbessingen
Gehofen
Helbedündorf
|valign=top|
Holzsußra
Kalbsrieth
Kyffhäuserland
Mönchpfiffel-Nikolausrieth
Oberheldrungen
Reinsdorf
Rockstedt
|}

Further information on the former Verwaltungsgemeinschaft: Kyffhäuser

References

External links
Official website (German)
Touristic website (English, German)

 
Districts of Thuringia